Padatha Painkili is a 1957 Indian Malayalam-language drama film based on the novel of the same name by Muttathu Varkey and directed by P. Subramaniam from a screenplay by Varkey. The film revolves around marriage and dowry problems. It depicts the machinations of a wicked, though wealthy man, against a poverty-stricken, God-fearing school master, with the final defeat of evil in the end. It stars Prem Nazir, Miss Kumari and Shanthi.

The film released in theatres on 22 March and went on to become a major critical and commercial success. It won the National Film Award for Best Feature Film in Malayalam.

Plot
Vendor Kutty, a wealthy villager, is jealous and scheming to marry his daughter Lucy to the richest bachelor of the town. He is, however, jealous of Luke, the neighbour, who is a kind-hearted village school teacher and has a daughter Chinnamma, of marriageable age.

Thankachan is the rich man of the locality and the prospective groom of Lucy. When he meets with an accident, both Chinnamma and Lucy happen to be there and Lucy rushes home to get some cloth for a bandage, the simple-hearted Chinnamma tears her only upper cloth and offers first-aid to Thankachan. This simple act makes a bond between the two and Thankachan in turn offers financial help to Chinnamma when her father is taken seriously ill.

Chinnamma is being engaged to the Beeri-maker, Chakkaravakkal, whose father demands a big dowry. Luke makes herculian effort to raise money but Kutty is determined to see that he is unable to secure the loan.

Chinnamma's marriage is fixed for the day when Lucy is to be betrothed to Thankachan. The marriage party is at Luke's door. On the instigation of Kutty, Vakkan's father insists on the promised dowry. But the poor father is unable to produce it. The marriage stands dissolved.

In the neighbourhood, Thankachan has come for his betrothal with Lucy. He discovers Luke's predicament. On the spur of the moment he decides to marry Chinnamma and the story ends on a happy note.

Cast
The film marks the debut of Shanthi. Bahadoor's role as Chakkaravakkal was his first break.
 Prem Nazir as Thankachan
 Miss Kumari as Chinnamma
 K. V. Shanthi as Lucy
 Kottarakkara Sreedharan Nair as Vendor Kutty
 Bahadoor as Chakkaravakkal
 T. S. Muthaiah as Luke (Luka Sir)
 Aranmula Ponnamma as Kunjadamma
 Vaanakkutti as Peeli
 S. P. Pillai as Mylan
 Adoor Pankajam as Thevi
 Pankajavalli
 T. N. Gopinathan Nair
 S. Menon
 Latheef
 Kuttiyamma

Soundtrack
The film's music has been composed by Brother Lakshmanan with lyrics penned by Thirunayinaarkurichi Madhavan Nair.
"Aaru Nee Agathiyo" — Kamukara, Santha P. Nair  
"Kaalithan Thozhuthil" — P. Leela, Chorus  
"Kalyaanaraave (Bit)" — Santha P. Nair  
"Madhumaasamayallo" — Kamukara, Santha P. Nair
"Mangalam" — Kamukara, Santha P. Nair  
"Naaduchutti Odivaroo" — Mehboob  
"Naayaka Poroo" — Uncategorized
"Njan Natta Thoomulla" — Santha P. Nair  
"Paadedi Paadedi" — Kamukara, C. S. Radhadevi  
"Poomani Kovilil" — Santha P. Nair  
"Snehame Karayatta Nin Kai" — Kamukara  
"Thanthoya Thenundu" — P. Gangadharan Nair, C. S. Radhadevi  
"Vellaambal Poothu" — Kamukara, Santha P. Nair

Awards 
 National Film Awards
 1957 - National Film Award for Best Feature Film in Malayalam

References

External links
 Padatha Painkili at the Malayalam Movie Database
 

1950s Malayalam-language films
1957 romantic drama films
Films based on Indian novels
Best Malayalam Feature Film National Film Award winners
Films directed by P. Subramaniam
1957 films
Indian romantic drama films
Films scored by Br Lakshmanan
Indian black-and-white films